Šesta knjiga sanj is a novel by Slovenian author . It was first published in 2006.

See also
List of Slovenian novels

References

Slovenian novels
2006 novels